
LiMo may refer to:

 LiMo Foundation, an organisation developing a mobile phone platform, the LiMo Platform.
 LiMo Platform, a mobile phone platform developed by the LiMo Foundation.

See also
Limo (disambiguation)